Loomis James Shadbolt (May 11, 1883 – March 9, 1963) was an American politician in the state of Washington. He served in the Washington House of Representatives from 1941 to 1953.

References

1883 births
1963 deaths
Republican Party members of the Washington House of Representatives